Agron Sulaj (26 November 1952 – 8 April 1996) was an Albanian footballer and from 1985 until 1987 and for a short time again in 1990 coach of the Albania national team.

Managerial career
Born in Vlorë, Sulaj's playing career was cut short by injury at 27 and he became the youngest coach of hometown club Flamurtari Vlorë.

References

1952 births
1996 deaths
Footballers from Vlorë
Albanian footballers
Association football defenders
Shkëndija Tiranë players
Flamurtari Vlorë players
Albanian football managers
Flamurtari Vlorë managers
Albania national football team managers
Potenza S.C. managers
Kategoria Superiore players
Kategoria Superiore managers
Albanian expatriate football managers
Expatriate football managers in Italy
Albanian expatriate sportspeople in Italy